Wan Po North is one of the 29 constituencies in the Sai Kung District.

The constituency returns one district councillor to the Sai Kung District Council, with an election every four years.

Wan Po North constituency is loosely based on Oscar By The Sea, The Beaumount and part of Lohas Park in Tseung Kwan O with estimated population of 18,855.

Councillors represented

Election results

2010s

References

Tseung Kwan O
Constituencies of Hong Kong
Constituencies of Sai Kung District Council
2015 establishments in Hong Kong
Constituencies established in 2015